Millville is an unincorporated community in York County, New Brunswick, Canada. It held village status prior to 2023. It is at the intersection of Route 104 and Route 605.

Situated on the Nackawic River approximately 58.16 kilometers northwest of Fredericton, Millville has one combination convenience store and gas station both have now been closed, as well as a volunteer fire department and several churches and post office. The village is famous for having the World's Largest Artificial Maple Leaf.

The community is served by the Millville Fire Department, consisting of approximately 18 volunteer firefighters.

History

Millville was established about 1860 as a New Brunswick and Nova Scotia Land Company settlement. A post office was established in 1866. In 1898, Millville was a station on the Canadian Pacific Railway. It was incorporated as a village in 1966.

On 1 January 2023, Millville amalgamated with the town of Nackawic and parts of four local service districts to form the new incorporated rural community of Nackawic-Millville. The community's name remains in official use.

Demographics

Notable people

See also
List of communities in New Brunswick
List of world's largest roadside attractions

References

Former villages in New Brunswick
Communities in York County, New Brunswick